Alin Sumarwata is an Iranian-born Australian actress, whose roles include May Stone in soap opera Home and Away, Sophia Angleton in East West 101 and Vanessa Villante in Neighbours, a role she played from 2012 to 2013, 2015 and 2019. She has also starred in Strike Back: Retribution, Strike Back: Revolution and Strike Back: Vendetta as Gracie Novin.

Early life
Sumarwata was born in Tehran, Iran. She moved to Australia with her family at the age of seven. Sumarwata gained a scholarship to the Australian Theatre for Young People and later attended the Newtown High School of the Performing Arts. She worked part time in a law firm and an accounting firm, while she graduated from Macquarie University with a Bachelor of Commerce and a Bachelor of Laws.

Career
One of Sumarwata's early acting jobs was a role on Indonesian television soap opera Kenapa Ada Cinta. In 2009, Sumarwata starred as Yasmin Van Koors in the mini-series, False Witness. She joined the cast of Home and Away in the recurring role of May Stone, before moving onto roles in Rescue Special Ops and East West 101. 

Sumarwata stars as Isabella Fortino in short film, Dark Horse. For her portrayal of Isabella, Sumarwata won the "Best Female Actor in a Short Film" award at the Melbourne Underground Film Festival. The following year, Sumarwata appeared in Sea Patrol and Tangle. 

On 5 December 2011, it was announced Sumarwata had joined the cast of Neighbours in the regular role of Vanessa Villante. Sumarwata and her family relocated from Sydney to Melbourne, so she could film her scenes. Sumarwata's character was written out in 2013. She made three guest appearances in 2015, and she reprised the role again in 2019.

In 2016, Sumarwata joined the cast of Strike Back as Gracie Novin for the show's sixth series, which began airing in 2017. She reprised the role for the seventh series Strike Back: Revolution, which aired in 2019. Sumarwata reprised the role for the final season, Strike Back: Vendetta which started airing on February 14, 2020.

Personal life
Sumarwata is married to actor Don Hany. They have two daughters.

Filmography

References

External links
 

Living people
Iranian emigrants to Australia
Australian accountants
Australian women lawyers
Australian people of Indonesian descent
Macquarie Law School alumni
Year of birth missing (living people)
Australian soap opera actresses
20th-century Australian lawyers